Boleslav Skhirtladze (born 14 June 1987 in Tbilisi) is a Georgian long jumper. He competed in the long jump event at the 2012 Summer Olympics.

References

1987 births
Living people
Sportspeople from Tbilisi
Male long jumpers from Georgia (country)
Olympic athletes of Georgia (country)
Athletes (track and field) at the 2012 Summer Olympics